Artem Sitak and Igor Zelenay were the defending champions but only Zelenay chose to defend his title, partnering Roman Jebavý. Zelenay lost in the quarterfinals to Zdeněk Kolář and Lukáš Rosol.

Marc Polmans and Sergiy Stakhovsky won the title after defeating Andrew Paulson and Patrik Rikl 7–6(7–4), 3–6, [10–7] in the final.

Seeds

Draw

References

External links
 Main draw

Ostrava Challenger - Doubles
2021 Doubles